The 1998 Appalachian State Mountaineers football team was an American football team that represented Appalachian State University as a member of the Southern Conference (SoCon) during the 1998 NCAA Division I-AA football season. In their tenth year under head coach Jerry Moore, the Mountaineers compiled an overall record of 10–3, with a conference mark of 6–2.

Schedule

References

Appalachian State
Appalachian State Mountaineers football seasons
Appalachian State Mountaineers football